McGowan  is an Irish and Scottish surname. It is an Anglicization of the Irish Mac Gabhann and Scottish surname Mac Gobhann. Belonging to the Uí Echach Cobo, located in modern-day County Down in the east of Ulster, they produced several over-kings of Ulaid. By the late 12th century, the English had expelled the McGowans to Tír Chonaill (now largely modern-day County Donegal) in the west of Ulster.

Meaning
As noted further in source by John O'Hart, though not an occupational surname, MacGowan evolves as an Anglicization of the original Gaelic language personal description or nickname gobha, meaning "blacksmith". For this reason, the surnames of some septs of the MacGowan are alternately anglicised to Smythe or Smith. Mac, which may appear in anglicised contraction as Mc, sometimes written Mc or, further, abbreviated M', means in English "son", but, when an element used to form a Gaelic language patronymic in its usage of "They have no share in the promise made to the sons of Adam“, that is "descended" of a thereafter personal named or nicknamed (sometimes by description as in Gaelic language Duinneshliebhe, anglicised Donlevy, "brown haired chief of the mountain fort", Gaelic language gobha "the smithy", anglicised Gowan, or the Gaelic language Ultaigh, anglicised Nulty, "the Ulidian") founding ancestor or sire of a Gaelic clan. The surname Mac Gowan, therefore, translates from Gaelic language to English language as "descended of the smith".

Scottish Origins
In Scotland, Mac an Ghobhain was anglicized to MacGowan. Mac Gobha, later McGow, was also made MacGowan. As the maker of arms and armor, the smith was an important hereditary position in each clan and there were MacGowans, or MacGouns, found throughout the Highlands. The two most important septs, however, were the MacGowans of Clan Donald (only to be found in Antrim and South Uist) and those of Clan MacPherson. 

There was also a Clan McGowan noted in fourteenth century Nithsdale in Dumfriesshire, and in Sterlingshire there was an old family of MacGowans of uncertain origin.

Irish Origins
In Ireland the name MacGowan refers to an eponymous ancestor, Aengus an Gobhain ("Angus the Smith") or Áengus Goibnenn mac Fergus Gallen mheic Tibraide Tirech, who was a High King of Ulster and the son of Fergus Galeng, son of Tipraiti Tireach. 

The MacGowans were formerly chiefs in Dalariada, a principality in eastern Ulidia. However, they were driven to Donegal, Cavan, and Sligo in the 12th century due to English invasions in eastern Ireland. The MacGowans who settled in Sligo had their home at Castlegowan in Sligo, and thereafter a great number of them moved to Rossinver Parish in Leitrim.

This family gave birth to many eminent ecclesiastics and literary men, and among the latter class may be mentioned Tadg Mac-an-Gowan, chief historiographer to the O'Connors towards the close of the 14th century ; Felan M'an- Gowan by whom, assisted by the O'Dugans of East Galway, was compiled the " Book of the O'Kellys," commonly called the " Book of Hy-Many ;" and the no less distin guished ecclesiastical writer, Angus Ceile De M'anGowan, author of " Lives of the Irish Saints," and other tracts, who lived in the third quarter of the eighth century, and of whom the following pedigree is preserved.

As for the MacGowans who remained in the north east of Ireland (in Antrim specifically)), this family would later be associated with the MacDonnell Chieftains, who were a branch of the Scottish Clan Donald.

Notable people

 Alistair McGowan (born 1964), British impressionist
 Andrew McGowan (born 1961), Australian priest and scholar
 Angela McGowan, Australian archeologist
 Archibald C. McGowan (1822–1893), New York politician
 Baron McGowan, the title of four Scottish barons
 Bill McGowan (1896–1954), American baseball umpire
 Brandon McGowan (born 1983), American football player
 Brian McGowan (disambiguation) several people including:
 Brian McGowan (businessman) (born 1945), co-founder of Williams Holdings
 Brian McGowan (footballer) (born 1938), Australian rules footballer
 Brian McGowan (politician) (1935–1994), member of the New South Wales Legislative Assembly
 Charles M. McGowan (1923–2013), American businessman and politician
 Donald W. McGowan (1899–1967), U.S. Army Major General
 Dustin McGowan (born 1982), North American baseball player
 Dylan McGowan (born 1991), Australian soccer player 
 Gavin McGowan (born 1976), English footballer
 Gerald S. McGowan (born 1946), United States Ambassador to Portugal, 1998–2001
 J. P. McGowan (1880–1952), Australian-American actor, screenwriter, and director
 James McGowen (1855–1922), Premier of New South Wales 1910–1913   
 Jewel McGowan (1921–1962), American dancer
 Joe McGowan (born 1944), Irish historian
 John McGowan (disambiguation), several people, including
Jack McGowan (1894–1977), Broadway writer, performer and producer
John McGowan (footballer), Scottish footballer
Jack McGowan (golfer) (1930–2001), American professional golfer
John McGowan (Medal of Honor) (1831–?), American Civil War sailor and Medal of Honor recipient
John McGowan (Ontario politician) (1845–1922), Ontario MPP and member of the Canadian House of Commons
John McGowan (professor) (born 1953), academic at the University of North Carolina, author, editor
J. P. McGowan John Paterson McGowan (1880–1952), Hollywood actor and director
John Reid McGowan (1872–1912), Australian boxing champion
 Jonas H. McGowan (1837–1909), US Representative from Michigan
 Kathleen McGowan (born 1963), American novelist
 Keith McGowan (born 1943), Australian radio presenter
 Kevin McGowan (born 1991), American baseball player
 Kyric McGowan (born 1999), American football player
 Margaret M. McGowan (born 1931), scholar
 Mark McGowan (disambiguation), several people
Mark McGowan (born 1967), Australian politician and Premier of Western Australia.
 Mark McGowan (Gaelic footballer) (born 1988), Donegal player
 Mark McGowan (performance artist) (born 1964), British protester
 Martin McGowan (disambiguation), several people, including
 Martin McGowan (footballer) (born 1962), Scottish footballer
 Martin McGowan (Irish politician) (died 1958), Irish politician and teacher
 Martin J. McGowan, Jr. (1920–2009), American politician and newspaper editor
 Ned McGowan (lawyer) (1812–1892), North American Gold rush pioneer
 Pat McGowan (born 1954), American golfer
 Patrick K. McGowan, American politician
 P. J. McGowan (born 1950s), Irish Gaelic football manager and administrator
 Richard McGowan (1933–2007), American explorer, mountaineer, and entrepreneur
 Robert McGowan (disambiguation), several people, including
 Robert A. McGowan (1901–1955), American screenwriter and director
 Robert F. McGowan (1882–1955), American film director and producer
 Robert Barrington-Ward Robert McGowan Barrington-Ward (1891–1948), journalist
 Robert McGowan Coventry (1855–1914), Scottish painter
 Robert McGowan Dickie (c. 1784 – 1854), Nova Scotia legislator
 Robert McGowan Littlejohn (1890–1982), American major general
 Rose McGowan (born 1973), American actress
 Ross McGowan (born 1982), English golfer
 Ryan McGowan (born 1989), Australian soccer player
 Samuel McGowan (admiral) (1870–1934), admiral in the United States Navy
 Samuel McGowan (general) (1819–1897), Confederate general during the American Civil War
 Samuel Henry McGowan (c. 1844 – 1921), gold mining entrepreneur in Bendigo, Victoria, Australia
 Steve McGowan (disambiguation), several people, including
 Stephen McGowan, chief financial officer of Sun Microsystems
 Stephen McGowan (footballer) (born 1984) Scottish (soccer) footballer
 Stephen McGowan (kidnap victim), South African and British citizen, kidnapped in Mali
 Steve McGowan, English rugby league player
 Taj McGowan (born 1997), American football player
 Tom McGowan (born 1959), American actor
 Thomas F. McGowan (1925–1997), New York politician and judge
 Zach McGowan (born 1980), actor, producer, voice-over artist 

MacGowan
 Alice MacGowan (1858–1947), American writer
 Shane MacGowan (born 1957), Irish musician
 Foster MacGowan Voorhees (1856–1927), American politician, governor of New Jersey

Gowan
 Hunter Gowan John Hunter Gowan II (c. 1727 – 1824), Irish Protestant politician and militiaman
 Lawrence Gowan (born 1956), Canadian musician who used the stage name Gowan
 Ogle Robert Gowan (1803–1876), Canadian-Irish politician, son of Hunter Gowan
 Peter Gowan (1946–2009), UK socialist academic

Other uses
USS McGowan (DD-678), a US Navy destroyer

See also
 McGowan Lakes, a series of seven small alpine glacial lakes in Custer County, Idaho, United States
McGowan v. Maryland, a US Supreme Court case involving trading on Sunday
 McGowan's Pass, a topographical feature of Central Park in New York City, New York
 McGowan Station, an island platformed METRORail light rail station in Houston, Texas, United States 
 McGowan's War, a bloodless war that took place in Yale, British Columbia in the fall of 1858 and, there, threatened the newly established British authority on the mainland 
 McGowan, Washington, a community in Washington state
 McGoohan
 Recipients of the Legion of Merit, awarded to 3 McGowan
 Distinguished Service Medal (US Army), one McGowan General officer recipient

References

Anglicised Irish-language surnames
Irish royal families
Scottish surnames